The Samsung Galaxy Note 9 (stylized as Samsung Galaxy Note9) is an Android-based phablet designed, developed, produced and marketed by Samsung Electronics as part of the Samsung Galaxy Note series. It was unveiled on 9 August 2018, as the successor to the Samsung Galaxy Note 8. It is available in six colours (Ocean Blue, Midnight Black, Lavender Purple, Metallic Copper, Cloud Silver, and Alpine White).

History 
Many Galaxy Note 9 features were leaked before the official launch, including its S-Pen. On 27 June 2018, Samsung sent out invites for the next "Unpacked" event, showing a gold S Pen image. According to that teaser, it was announced on 9 August 2018.

On 15 July 2018, a picture was posted showing Samsung co-CEO Koh Dong-Jin holding a Galaxy Note 9.

On 2 August 2018, a picture of the box with the Note 9 was posted from Russia.

Specifications

Hardware

Screen 
The Note 9 has a 6.4-inch (160 mm) 1440p Super AMOLED display with an 18.5:9 aspect ratio. The design on the front is otherwise similar to the Note 8, using an "Infinity Display" as marketed by Samsung.

Chipsets 
The Note 9 uses a Qualcomm Snapdragon 845 SoC in North America, China, Hong Kong, Japan, and Latin America or a Samsung Exynos 9810 SoC in Australia, United Kingdom and the rest of the world.

Storage 
It has 128 or 512 GB storage options. The 128 GB model has 6 GB of RAM while the 512 GB model has 8 GB of RAM, making it the first Samsung flagship mobile phone with 512 GB of internal storage and 8 GB of RAM. All models also have a microSD card slot that can support a microSD card that stores up to 512 gigabytes of data, expanding storage up to 1 terabyte with the 512 GB model.

Battery 
The 4000 ⁠mAh battery is significantly upgraded from previous Samsung Galaxy phones such as the Note ⁠8, which came with a 3300 ⁠mAh, while the Galaxy Note 7 and Galaxy Note 5 came with 3500 mAh and 3000 mAh respectively. A 4000 ⁠mAh battery was previously seen only in the Active variants of the S7 and S8.

The Note 9 has fast wireless charging capabilities via the Qi standard.

Wired fast charging is supported at up to 15 Watts using Qualcomm Quick Charge 2.0.

Camera 
The dual-camera system on the Note 9 is similar to that of the Note 8 and the S9, consisting of a 12MP primary wide-angle lens (with the notable addition of a dual-aperture system going from ƒ/1.5-ƒ/2.4 with a 1/2.55-inch sensor and dual-pixel PDAF) and a 12MP ƒ/2.4 telephoto lens capable of 2x optical zoom and 10x digital zoom (with a 1/3.6-inch sensor and AF). Both lenses are optically stabilized. The lenses were arranged horizontally in the camera module on the back of the phone. Like on the S9, the Note 9 supports video recording at 4K resolution (2160p) at up to 60 fps, with slow motion ranging from 240 fps at 1080p (FHD) and 960 fps (marketed as Super Slow-Mo) at 720p (HD).

The camera software now includes AI scene recognition that is capable of identifying 20 different types of scenes then making appropriate adjustments to the camera's settings to improve image quality.

A unique feature has been added which warns of blinking eyes, blurred photo, dirty lens etc after each photograph is taken.

Exterior 
The Note 9 has IP68 water & dust resistance and a USB-C connector that supports Samsung DeX without a dock, through HDMI. It has a 3.5 mm headphone jack along with AKG tuned stereo speakers with Dolby Atmos support. It is the last Samsung Galaxy Note device to come with a headphone jack. The phone is made out of metal.

The fingerprint sensor has been moved to below the camera setup, just like the S9 & S9+, rather than next to the camera like on the Note 8.

There is also a water carbon heat pipe on the phone as part of the touting towards its gaming capability allowing for longer gaming sessions without thermal throttling.

S-Pen 
The biggest change to the Note 9 is to the S-Pen. The S-Pen now has Bluetooth capabilities, including the ability to tap the button on it (hold, single or double) to do certain tasks, such as moving forwards or backwards in presentations or taking photos, and third party support is provided for apps via an SDK.

The S-Pen now has a "battery" (essentially a Super Capacitor) that charges when the pen is docked in the silo, with Samsung claiming 30 minutes of usage (or up to 200 clicks of the button) with only 40 seconds of charging.

Software 
The Note 9 ships with Android 8.1 Oreo with Samsung Experience 9.5 as the software overlay. The phone was later updated to Android 10 with Samsung's One UI. One UI version 2.5 was released to the phone in October 2020.

See also 
 Samsung Galaxy S9
 Samsung Galaxy Note 8
 Samsung Galaxy Note series

References

External links 

 Official website

Mobile phones introduced in 2018
Samsung Galaxy
9
Samsung mobile phones
Samsung smartphones
Android (operating system) devices
Mobile phones with multiple rear cameras
Mobile phones with 4K video recording
Mobile phones with stylus
Discontinued smartphones